The Shaping of Middle-earth – The Quenta, The Ambarkanta and The Annals (1986) is the fourth volume of Christopher Tolkien's 12-volume series The History of Middle-earth in which he analysed the unpublished manuscripts of his father J. R. R. Tolkien.

Book

Inscription 

There is an inscription in the Fëanorian characters (Tengwar, an alphabet Tolkien has devised for High-Elves) in the first pages of every History of Middle-earth volume, written by Christopher Tolkien and describing the contents of the book. The inscription in Book IV reads: "Herein are the Quenta Noldorinwa, the History of the Gnomes, the Ambarkanta or Shape of the World by Rúmil, the Annals of Valinor and the Annals of Beleriand by Pengolod, the Wise of Gondolin with maps of the world in the Elder Days and translations made by Ælfwine the Mariner of England into the tongue of his own land".

Contents 

In The Shaping of Middle-earth the gradual transition from the "primitive" legendaria of The Book of Lost Tales to what would become The Silmarillion is described, and it contains a text which could be seen as the first "Silmarillion": the "Sketch of the Mythology".

Three other parts are the Ambarkanta or "Shape of the World", a collection of maps and diagrams of the world described by Tolkien; and the Annals of Valinor and Beleriand, chronological works which started out as timelines but gradually turned into full narratives.

 Prose fragments following the Lost Tales — brief, uncompleted texts which continue on from The Book of Lost Tales
 The earliest "Silmarillion" — also referred to as the "Sketch of the Mythology", this is the start of the Silmarillion proper
 The Quenta Noldorinwa — a further developed version of the "Sketch", the first full narrative since the legends and the only instance where Tolkien completed it. It is notable for having the latest full narrative of the story of Tuor and the fall of the hidden Elven city of Gondolin.
 The first "Silmarillion" map — a reproduction of the first map of Beleriand
 The Ambarkanta — cosmological essays, maps, and diagrams
 The earliest Annals of Valinor
 The earliest Annals of Beleriand

The Annals of Valinor and Annals of Beleriand show the earliest outline of the chronology of the First Age as envisaged in the early 1930s. 
The next volume in the series, The Lost Road and Other Writings (1987), outlined revisions to both texts made c. 1937 as "The Later Annals of Valinor" and "The Later Annals of Beleriand".

See also 

 Quenta Silmarillion

References 

Middle-earth books
Fantasy books by series
04
1986 books
Allen & Unwin books
Books published posthumously